Warp is the third and final album from New Musik released on 5 March 1982.

Track listing

LP: EPC 85567
All songs written by Tony Mansfield, except where noted.

Side One
"Here Come The People" – 3:26
"Going Around Again" – 2:55
"A Train On Twisted Tracks" – 3:26
"I Repeat" – 4:28
"All You Need Is Love" – 4:21
"All You Need Is Love" (Lennon–McCartney) – 5:38

Side Two
"Kingdoms for Horses" – 4:16
"Hunting" – 4:15
"The New Evolutionist (Example 'A')" – 3:19
"Green and Red (Respectively)" (Mansfield, Gates, Venner) – 3:05
"The Planet Doesn't Mind" – 3:40
"Warp" – 4:22

2001 Epic Records International CD Reissue: EICP 7015
"Here Come The People" – 3:26
"Going Around Again" – 2:55
"A Train On Twisted Tracks" – 3:26
"I Repeat" – 4:28
"All You Need Is Love" – 4:21
"All You Need Is Love" (Lennon–McCartney) – 5:38
"Kingdoms for Horses" – 4:16
"Hunting" – 4:15
"The New Evolutionist (Example 'A')" – 3:19
"Green and Red (Respectively)" (Mansfield, Gates, Venner) – 3:05
"The Planet Doesn't Mind" – 3:40
"Warp" – 4:22
"The Planet Doesn't Mind" (Single Version) – 3:36
"The Planet Doesn't Mind" (12 Inch Version) – 4:15
"24 Hours From Culture - Part II" – 3:40
"Twelfth House" – 4:37
"Here Come The People" (Remix) – 5:27

Personnel
Tony Mansfield – keyboards, guitars, vocals
Clive Gates – keyboards, vocals
Cliff Venner – percussion, vocals
Ion Baciu Jr. – grand piano solo on "All You Need Is Love"

Production
Produced by Tony Mansfield
Engineered by Peter Hammond
Mastered by Geoff Pesche at Tape One
Recorded at TMC
Design: Tony Mansfield and Rosław Szaybo
Artwork and Typography: Studio Gerrard

References

New Musik albums
1982 albums
Epic Records albums